Bill McHenry (born 1972) is an American jazz saxophonist and composer. He is the leader of the Bill McHenry Quartet and has released over a dozen albums under his own name, in addition to collaborating on many more.

Early life
McHenry was born in Blue Hill, Maine, in 1972. He attended the Interlochen Arts Academy, and went on to study at the New England Conservatory of Music.

Later life and career
McHenry moved to New York in 1992. His recording debut as a leader was Rest Stop, with Ben Monder, Chris Higgins and Dan Reiser in 1997. It was followed by Graphic two years later, with Ben Monder, Reid Anderson and Gerald Cleaver. In 2002 he recorded his music with Paul Motian and that led to appearances at the Village Vanguard and two more albums, Roses and Ghosts of the Sun, also with Ben Monder and Reid Anderson. Proximity, a duo recording with drummer Andrew Cyrille, was released around 2016.

Discography

As leader/co-leader
 Jazz Is Where You Find It (Fresh Sound, 1997)
 Rest Stop (Fresh Sound, 1997)
 Graphic (Fresh Sound, 1998)
 Live at Smalls with Reid Anderson, Ethan Iverson, and Jeff Williams (Fresh Sound, 2000)
 Quartet Featuring Paul Motian (Fresh Sound, 2002)
 Sonic Pressure (Fresh Sound, 2005)
 Roses (Sunnyside, 2007)
 Rediscovery with John McNeil (Sunnyside, 2008)
 Chill Morn He Climb Jenny with John McNeil (Sunnyside, 2010)
 Bloom with Ben Monder (Sunnyside, 2010)
 Ghosts of the Sun (Sunnyside, 2011)
 La Peur Du Vide (Sunnyside, 2012)
 Proximity with Andrew Cyrille (Sunnyside, 2016)
 Solo (Underpool 2018)

As sideman
With Avishai Cohen
Into the Silence (ECM, 2016)
With Guillermo Klein
Filtros
Live at the Village Vanguard (Sunnyside)
Los Guachos V (Sunnyside)
With Ethan Iverson
Live at Smalls (Fresh Sound, 2000)

References

External links
Bill McHenry Homepage

Avant-garde jazz musicians
American jazz saxophonists
American male saxophonists
People from Blue Hill, Maine
1962 births
Living people
New England Conservatory alumni
21st-century American saxophonists
21st-century American male musicians
American male jazz musicians
Fresh Sounds Records artists
Sunnyside Records artists